The Arabidopsis Information Resource (TAIR) is a community resource and online model organism database of genetic and molecular biology data for the model plant Arabidopsis thaliana, commonly known as mouse-ear cress.

TAIR integrates information about the Arabidopsis genome, genes, gene products, natural variants, mutant alleles and plant phenotypes and research literature. Data in TAIR can be retrieved using simple and advanced searches, bulk query and download tools, and in collections of prepared text files. The Arabidopsis genome and annotations can be visualized using the interactive SeqViewer and GBrowse tools. TAIR’s biocurators are responsible for acquiring and integrating data from the research literature (functional annotation) as well as for assisting the community in using Arabidopsis data and tools.  TAIR collaborates with the Arabidopsis Biological Resource Consortium (ABRC) to allow researchers to search, browse and order seed and DNA stocks. The ABRC's mission is to acquire, preserve and distribute seed and DNA resources that are useful to the Arabidopsis research community. TAIR’s community includes over 28,000 registered users and the website draws about 60,000 unique visitors per month.

TAIR is located at Phoenix Bioinformatics, and funded by subscriptions.

TAIR funding history

From its inception in 1999 to 2013, TAIR was primarily funded by the National Science Foundation (Grant No. DBI-0850219). In response to the end of NSF funding, a core group of TAIR staff founded the non-profit organization, Phoenix Bioinformatics, with the aim of finding creative solutions to database sustainability. In September 2013, with the support of Phoenix, TAIR transitioned to subscription revenues.  Subscription fees are used to fund continuous data curation and improvements to TAIR’s database and tools. TAIR offers a variety of subscription options to access the full, up-to-date resource.

To ensure the greatest community access to data, and promote data reuse, subscriber-only data in TAIR is made available to the public one year after its initial release on the TAIR site.

References

External links
The Arabidopsis Information Resource

Model organism databases
Arabidopsis thaliana